Friends with benefits relationships (FWB or FWBR) is a term commonly used to reference a relationship that is sexual without being romantic. Typically, these relationships can be between people that consider themselves non-platonic and friends. These non-committal relationships can be short term, or evolve into serious romantic relationships. FWB relationships are enjoyed by both women and men, which is in contrast to casual sexual encounters, more prevalent among men.

Description

Purpose 
Research shows five different motivators for starting friends with benefits relationships:

 Just sex (purely sexual motivation)
 Emotional connection (the desire for increased closeness and/or intimacy)
 Relationship simplicity (wanting an easy, natural, and stress-free relationship)
 Avoidance of a more serious relationship (purposeful avoidance of the exclusive and/or romantic elements)
 Wanted an FWBR (couples who "...became single and took advantage of the opportunity").

The parties involved in FWB relationships enter it with the understanding that the relationship will end at some point in time. This differs from romantic relationships in that the unsaid goal of a romantic relationship is for the parties involved to stay in the relationship long term.

However, as FWB relationships continue to evolve, individuals involved often have changing motivations for why they continue the FWB relationships. The motivation for many of these relationships is typically companionship, and after time the affection for the partners involved often becomes genuine.

Types of sexual relationships 
Unlike more casual relationships (i.e. sexting, one night stands, and other brief sexual encounters), FWBs continue to have a sexual relationships and romance. Although it seems similar, FWB relationships differ from casual sex relationships in that FWB relationships are a commitment to continuous casual sex. One-night stands are brief encounters with limited information exchanged. The parties involved typically part the next day without any additional communication. Booty calls are between people that are already acquainted, but not necessarily friends. Booty calls are usually recurring and do not develop into anything more. Sugaring involves exchanging gifts or money for companionship.

Challenges with friends with benefits relationships 
FWB relationships include friendship and sexual interactions without romance. In some ways, the success of this type of relationship is rooted in avoidance. Even with the rise in popularity in friends with benefits relationships, there is not a high success rate of continued friendship at the end of a friends with benefits relationship. Although these relationships are established to safely connect with a partner without the emotions, often these relationships are not genuine. Research on deceptive affection shows that people often hide their honest feelings because of concern that they will not be mutual or well received. Deceptive affection ends up being used as a tool to protect personal feelings so that no one gets hurt. Ultimately, these relationships continue to be complex despite the attempt to be void of emotions, the lines become blurred and feelings are sometimes developed by one partner that are not always well received by the other.

History

Terminology 
The origin of the term "friends with benefits" is difficult to trace, although it is regularly used and practiced in today's society. The earliest known use of the term is documented in Alanis Morissette's 1995-1996 song "Head over Feet" when she says, "you're my best friend, best friend with benefits".

Cultural movements

Third wave feminism 
According to research, women often report that they do not feel their needs are being met in FWB relationships. Third wave feminism is the evolution of second-wave feminism. Third-wave feminism is the belief that "young women should not be inhibited either by traditional norms of sexuality that stigmatize female sexual experimentation in non-committed relationships, nor by a sense that one form of sexual practice is more "feminist" than another (Williams & Jovanovic, pp. 158)." Third-wave feminism is often described in comparison to its past versions as “more evolved and sexually expressive, and third wave feminists defy the expectation that women's sexuality is simplistic.” Third-wave feminists also reject the notion that young women engaging in casual sex, FWB relationships, etc. should be labeled as "sluts". Arguments can be made by third wave feminists on both sides about the positives and negatives of FWB relationships. On the one hand, FWB relationships allow women to explore their sexuality in an affaire de coeur that can be considered "safe", even if it is non-committal, giving them the space to communicate their needs. On another hand, FWB relationships may not help women navigate the full extent of their sexual agency without exploitation.

Portrayal in media 
In 2011, the film Friends with Benefits, starring Justin Timberlake and Mila Kunis, was released which depicted a friends with benefits relationship between the two co-stars. Within the same year, the film No Strings Attached, starring Natalie Portman and Ashton Kutcher was also released. It as well depicted a friends with benefits relationship between its own two co-stars. Since then, the concept has become a phenomenon that is frequently referenced in popular culture and adopted by society.

Research and studies 
There are many studies that examine how FWB relationships progress among college aged students.

In an era of increased sexual liberation, casual sexual relationships continue to become more prominent. Studies show that an increasing number of college students, both male and female, report having a friends with benefits relationship at some point. Men tend to view FWB relationships as casual, while women tend to view them as friendships. Men are also more likely to have sexual relations with someone that they are not in a romantic relationship with.

Themes that emerged from one study on FWB at a university in southern California included "(1) FWB relationships as empowering to young women, (2) FWB relationships as not empowering to young women, (3) FWB relationships as providing a safe option in place of hook-ups, and (4) control and power in FWB relationships" (Williams & Jovanovic, pp. 167)."

Another study proved that individuals who avoid attachment experience less sexual satisfaction in relationships. This study also found a correlation between attachment anxiety and sexual satisfaction.

As FWB relationships continue to be a topic of interest, research on the subject is starting to lose its negative connotation. FWB relationships continue to grow in popularity amongst young people and older people without young children.

Theories

Affection exchange theory 
Affection exchange theory states "individuals need to give and receive affection in order to survive and procreate." When individuals are not a part of healthy relationships that allow them to show affection without question, then they have less anxiety in relationships. Although some FWB relationships can withhold affection, some FWB relationships can give individuals the opportunity to receive affection even if they are not in a committed relationship. Post sex communication like pillow talk, cuddling, and kissing can have positive outcomes. When this does not happen, individuals can harbor hostility. Research shows that relationships that do not have healthy communication post sex (like some FWB relationships) can experience attachment avoidance due to lack of affectionate communication. In order for individuals to feel sexual satisfaction, it is important to understand the attachment needs of the parties involved in the sexual relationship.

Self-determination theory 
Stein et al. claim that part of the allure of friends with benefits relationships ties into self-determination theory (SDT) (pp. 318). SDT delves into the human need to continuously search for new challenges. FWB relationships attract so many people because of the allure of the easy going non-committal relationship. The root of SDT is the need to have goals that are either approach focused, or avoidance focused. Approach focused goals are centered on what an individual can gain from a relationship, in a FWB situation this can be sex. Avoidance focused goals look at failures that can be avoided. In the case of FWB relationships, an individual can avoid a romantic relationship ending with a negative outcome.

See also 

 Back-up partner
 Fornication
 Group sex
 Open relationship
 Promiscuity
 Sociosexual orientation
 Casual relationship
 Forms of nonmonogamy
 Open marriage
 Casual sex

References 

Casual sex